Luvsansharav is a Mongolian personal name.

Notable people with the name include:
as proper name
Dagvyn Luvsansharav (born 1926), Mongolian composer
Dorjjavyn Luvsansharav (1900–1941), Mongolian communist
as patronymic
 Luvsansharavyn Tsend (born 1940), Mongolian former speedskater